The Score (simplified Chinese: 无花果) is a Singaporean Chinese drama which was telecasted on Singapore's free-to-air channel, MediaCorp Channel 8. It stars Zhang Yaodong, Paige Chua, Pierre Png, Cai Peixuan, Xiang Yun, Huang Wenyong & Terence Cao as the main casts of the series. It made its debut on 4 October 2010 and ended on 5 November 2010. This drama serial consists of 25 episodes, and was screened on every weekday night at 9:00 pm. The encore is being made from 28 September 2011 to 1 November 2011 at every weekday at 5:30pm. Due to its violent scenes, this drama was not awarded any nominations in acting categories at the Star Awards 2011.

Cast
 Zhang Yaodong as Luo Shunbang (James)
 Paige Chua as Zhou Tianlan
 Pierre Png as Luo Shunan
 Cai Peixuan as Hong Youli (Yuki)
 Xiang Yun as Xu Anna
 Huang Wenyong as Luo Zhigang
 Terence Cao as Su Nancheng
 Huang Shinan as Hong Shichuan (Mark) 
 Adam Chen as David Zhang
 Richard Low as Luo Zhibin
 Yan Bingliang as Xu Xiong 
 Desmond Sim as Albert

References 

Singapore Chinese dramas
2010 Singaporean television series debuts
2010 Singaporean television series endings
2010 Singaporean television seasons
Channel 8 (Singapore) original programming